Corsica is a city in Douglas County, South Dakota, United States. The population was 561 at the 2020 census.

History
Corsica was laid out in 1906. The town took its name from Corsica, the native land of a share of the railroad workers.

Geography
Corsica is located at  (43.424328, -98.406032).

Corsica has been assigned the ZIP code 57328 and the FIPS place code 13980.

Demographics

2010 census
As of the census of 2010, there were 592 people, 245 households, and 153 families residing in the city. The racial makeup of the city was 97.6% White, 0.2% African American, 0.7% Native American, 0.2% Asian, and 1.4% from two or more races. Hispanic or Latino of any race were 1.0% of the population.

There were 245 households, of which 23.3% had children under the age of 18 living with them, 51.4% were married couples living together, 8.6% had a female householder with no husband present, 2.4% had a male householder with no wife present, and 37.6% were non-families. 31.4% of all households were made up of individuals, and 20.4% had someone living alone who was 65 years of age or older. The average household size was 2.20 and the average family size was 2.78.

The median age in the city was 53 years. 19.3% of residents were under the age of 18; 6.9% were between the ages of 18 and 24; 14.5% were from 25 to 44; 25.5% were from 45 to 64; and 33.8% were 65 years of age or older. The gender makeup of the city was 47.3% male and 52.7% female.

2000 census
As of the census of 2000, there were 644 people, 259 households, and 163 families residing in the city. The population density was 967.4 people per square mile (371.1/km2). There were 271 housing units at an average density of 407.1 per square mile (156.2/km2). The racial makeup of the city was 99.07% White, 0.31% African American, 0.31% Native American, and 0.31% from two or more races.

There were 259 households, out of which 27.0% had children under the age of 18 living with them, 56.8% were married couples living together, 5.0% had a female householder with no husband present, and 36.7% were non-families. 35.1% of all households were made up of individuals, and 23.9% had someone living alone who was 65 years of age or older. The average household size was 2.24 and the average family size was 2.91.

In the city, the population was spread out, with 22.2% under the age of 18, 5.4% from 18 to 24, 17.9% from 25 to 44, 20.8% from 45 to 64, and 33.7% who were 65 years of age or older. The median age was 48 years. For every 100 females, there were 77.4 males. For every 100 females age 18 and over, there were 74.6 males.

The median income for a household in the city was $27,589, and the median income for a family was $34,531. Males had a median income of $26,136 versus $18,333 for females. The per capita income for the city was $13,370. About 7.3% of families and 9.4% of the population were below the poverty line, including 8.6% of those under age 18 and 16.7% of those age 65 or over.

References

Cities in South Dakota
Cities in Douglas County, South Dakota